The Wrong Side of Heaven and the Righteous Side of Hell, Volume 1 is the fourth studio album by American heavy metal band Five Finger Death Punch and the first of two albums released by the band in 2013. It was released on July 30, 2013, through Prospect Park. Pre-orders for the album started on iTunes on June 18, 2013. The album debuted in the United States Billboard 200 charts at No. 2, their highest chart position in that country, with 113,000 copies sold. Volume 2 and Got Your Six would eventually tie this chart record. The album has been certified platinum by the Recording Industry Association of America (RIAA) for sales of at least 1,000,000 copies. The album was entirely produced by Kevin Churko and Five Finger Death Punch.

Background
On February 15, 2013, Five Finger Death Punch announced that they were working on their fourth album. On March 18, the band posted a promotional video for an upcoming tour with a new song titled "Here to Die". The song would end up appearing on The Wrong Side of Heaven and the Righteous Side of Hell, Volume 2 as the first track.

On May 1, 2013, the band announced that they would be releasing two studio albums in the year, with The Wrong Side of Heaven and the Righteous Side of Hell, Volume 1 being released on July 30, and Volume 2 following later in the year. Guitarist Zoltan Bathory said of the band's decision to release two albums: "We came off the road after a couple of great years of touring and were really amped up to write the 4th record. Everybody was in the right headspace and the band tighter than ever so it was a perfect storm. We jumped in head first and found ourselves 12–13 songs deep fairly quick but were still coming up with better and better material so we looked at each other and said... okay why stop there?... let’s keep going. Once we passed the 24th song we knew we’re going to have to do a double album. We had this massive amount of music that’s very dear to us, possibly the best material this band has ever created. At that point there was no way to decide which songs to leave off the album. So we made the decision to release them all."

Unlike the sequel to the album, Volume 1 features multiple guest appearances, including the aforementioned Rob Halford and Tech N9ne, along with Maria Brink. The deluxe version includes Max Cavalera and Jamey Jasta in addition to those already mentioned.

Singles
The album's opening track and lead single is "Lift Me Up", and features Judas Priest lead singer Rob Halford. The band debuted the song live during the 5th Annual Golden God Awards. It was subsequently released as a single on May 2, 2013. Lead singer Ivan Moody remarked that "just to work alongside an icon like Rob Halford, The Metal God, was absolutely surreal." Moody has said of the song's lyrical themes: "The song itself was originally written about overcoming everyday obstacles and less-than-perfect situations. Most of us weren't born with a silver spoon in our mouth, but if life dealt you all the wrong cards, you still have to play."

The album's second single, an LL Cool J cover of "Mama Said Knock You Out", was released on March 25, 2014. It features American rapper Tech N9ne.

The album's third single was the title track serving for both the albums, "Wrong Side of Heaven".

Track listing

Charts

Year-end charts

Certifications

Personnel

Band
 Ivan Moody – vocals
 Zoltan Bathory – rhythm guitar
 Jason Hook – lead guitar, backing vocals
 Jeremy Spencer – drums
 Chris Kael – bass, backing vocals

Additional personnel
 Kevin Churko – producer
 Rob Halford – additional vocals on "Lift Me Up"
 Tech N9ne – additional vocals on "Mama Said Knock You Out"
 Max Cavalera – additional vocals on "I.M.Sin"
 Maria Brink – additional vocals on "Anywhere But Here"
 Jamey Jasta – additional vocals on "Dot Your Eyes"

References

2013 albums
Five Finger Death Punch albums
Albums produced by Kevin Churko